Kiel is a surname or given name. As first name it is an alternate spelling of Kyle (kahyl). It can be pronounced like "Kyle" 

It is also believed to be rooted in the Hawaiian for "lily of the valley".

Notable bearers of this name

As a first name:

Kiel Brown (born 1984), Australian field hockey player
Kiel Martin (1944–1990), American actor
Kiel McClung (born 1985), American soccer player
Kiel McLeod (born 1982), Canadian hockey player
Kiel Moe (born 1976), American architect
Kiel Reijnen (born 1986), American cyclist
Kiel Pease (born 1983), American Visual Effects Artist
Kiel Cruz (born 1995), Filipino Engineer

As a surname:

Blair Kiel (1961–2012), American footballer
Deb Kiel (born 1957), American politician (Minnesota)
Emil Charles Kiel (1895–1971), American soldier
Friedrich Kiel (1821–1885), German composer
Friedrich-Wilhelm Kiel (born 1934), German politician
Gunner Kiel (born 1993), American footballer
Henry Kiel (1871–1942), American politician, mayor of St. Louis
Niklas Kiel (born 1997), German basketball player
Peter Kiel (born 1958), Australian rules footballer
Richard Kiel (1939–2014), American actor
Sid Kiel (1916–2007), South African cricketer
Terrence Kiel (1980–2008), American football player
Wayne Kiel (born 1949), Canadian curler and coach
Yehuda Kiel (1916–2011), Israeli educator

References

Given names